Jalalia is a village located in Chhachh Valley, the northern part of Attock District of the Punjab, Pakistan. It lies close to the borders of the Khyber Pakhtunkhwa.  

The village has two primary schools, a boys high school, fourteen Masjids and three Madrasahs. Like most villages, Jalalia is also an agricultural village producing wheat, maize and tobacco in addition to vegetables and fruits.

References

Villages in Attock District